Stay is Jeremy Camp's second studio album and his first major-label studio album, released in 2002.

Track listing

Personnel
 Jeremy Camp – lead and backing vocals, acoustic guitar
 Andy Dodd – electric guitar, 12-string guitar, piano, keyboards, backing vocals (6)
 Dave Vance – additional guitars (1, 3, 9, 10), electric guitar parts (3, 9, 11)
 Luke Agajanian – bass (1, 3, 9, 10, 11)
 Aubrey Torres – bass (2, 4–8, 12)
 Adam Watts – additional backing vocals, drums (1, 2, 4–8, 11), additional piano (2), additional guitar (4), percussion (12)
 Julian Rodriguez – drums (3, 9, 10)
 Leif Skartland – percussion (12)
 Brandon Roberts – string arrangements, conductor and composer (3, 6)

Production
 Produced by Adam Watts and Andy Dodd for Red Decibel Productions.
 Executive Producer – Brandon Ebel
 Recorded at Red Decibel Studios (Mission Viejo, CA).
 Engineered by Adam Watts and Andy Dodd
 Mixed by JR McNeely at The Castle (Franklin, TN), assisted by Steve Short.
 Strings recorded by Steve Kaplan at Citrus College (Glendora, CA).
 Mastered by Chris Bellman at Bernie Grundman Mastering (Hollywood, CA).
 Photography – Ben Pearson
 Design – Kris McCaddon
 Management – Matt Balm
 A&R – Tyson Paoletti

References 

2002 albums
Jeremy Camp albums
BEC Recordings albums